The , also read as Sasekishū, translated into English as Collection of Stone and Sand, is a five-volume collection of Buddhist parables written by the Japanese monk Mujū in 1283 during the Kamakura period.

It is best known in English for an excerpt included in 101 Zen Stories.

The text makes mention of the Yōkai known as the Nozuchi.

Notes

References
 
 
 
 

13th-century books
Early Middle Japanese texts
Setsuwa
Japanese books
Japanese Buddhist texts
Shinbutsu shūgō